Rottal-Inn is an electoral constituency (German: Wahlkreis) represented in the Bundestag. It elects one member via first-past-the-post voting. Under the current constituency numbering system, it is designated as constituency 230. It is located in southeastern Bavaria, comprising the Dingolfing-Landau district, Rottal-Inn district, and small parts of the Landkreis Landshut district.

Rottal-Inn was created for the inaugural 1949 federal election. Since 1994, it has been represented by Max Straubinger of the Christian Social Union (CSU).

Geography
Rottal-Inn is located in southeastern Bavaria. As of the 2021 federal election, it comprises the districts of Dingolfing-Landau and Rottal-Inn as well as the Verwaltungsgemeinschaften of Gerzen and Wörth a.d.Isar from the Landkreis Landshut district.

History
Rottal-Inn was created in 1949, then known as Pfarrkirchen. It acquired its current name in the 1976 election. In the 1949 election, it was Bavaria constituency 16 in the numbering system. In the 1953 through 1961 elections, it was number 211. In the 1965 through 1972 elections, it was number 217. In the 1976 through 1998 elections, it was number 216. In the 2002 and 2005 elections, it was number 231. Since the 2009 election, it has been number 230.

Originally, the constituency comprised the districts of Pfarrkirchen, Eggenfelden, and Vilsbiburg. From 1965 through 1972, it also contained the Griesbach district. From 1976 through 2013, it comprised the Rottal-Inn and Dingolfing-Landau districts. In the 2017 election, it acquired the Verwaltungsgemeinschaft of Gerzen from the Landkreis Landshut district. It further acquired the Verwaltungsgemeinschaft of Wörth a.d.Isar in the 2021 election.

Members
The constituency has been held by the Christian Social Union (CSU) during all but one Bundestag term since its creation. It was first represented by Conrad Fink from 1949 to 1953. He was elected for the Bavaria Party (BP), but joined the CSU in January 1952. Max Riederer von Paar of the CSU won the constituency in 1953 and served one term. Friedrich Kempfler was then representative from 1957 to 1976, followed by Günther Müller from 1976 to 1994. Max Straubinger was elected in 1994 and re-elected in 1998, 2002, 2005, 2009, 2013, 2017, and 2021.

Election results

2021 election

2017 election

2013 election

2009 election

Notes

References

Federal electoral districts in Bavaria
1949 establishments in West Germany
Constituencies established in 1949
Dingolfing-Landau
Rottal-Inn
Landshut (district)